Hendrik Toompere Jr. (born 5 June 1965) is an Estonian actor and director.

Toompere was born in Tallinn to actor and director Hendrik Toompere Sr. and actress Maie Toompere (née Kruusenberg). His sister is actress Harriet Toompere and his son is actor Hendrik Toompere Jr. Jr. His maternal grandfather was wrestler Herman Kruusenberg.

In 1988 he graduated from Tallinn State Conservatory Stage Art Department. From 1988 until 1989 he worked at Noorsooteater. Since 1990 he is working at Estonian Drama Theatre. Between 1996 and 2003, he was the author and director of advertisements in the company Brand Sellers DDB. He has also worked as a course instructor at the Estonian Academy of Music and Theatre. Besides theatrical roles he has also played on several films.

Awards:
 1998: 
 2016: Order of the White Star, IV class.

Selected filmography

 1985: Naerata ometi (role: Robi)
 1991: Ainult hulludele ehk halastajaõde (role: Johan)
 2006: Vana daami visiit (role: Artist)
 2009: Püha Tõnu kiusamine (role: Toivo)
 2015: Vehkleja (role: School principal)
 2016: Päevad, mis ajasid segadusse (role: Jaak)
 2022: Apteeker Melchior (role: Casendrope)

References

Living people
1965 births
Estonian male stage actors
Estonian male film actors
Estonian male television actors
Estonian theatre directors
Recipients of the Order of the White Star, 4th Class
Estonian Academy of Music and Theatre alumni
Academic staff of the Estonian Academy of Music and Theatre
20th-century Estonian male actors
21st-century Estonian male actors
Male actors from Tallinn